Born Free: A New Adventure is a 1996 American television adventure film starring Jonathan Brandis and Ariana Richards. The film was written by John McGreevey and directed by Tommy Lee Wallace. It was first aired at ABC on April 27, 1996. The film was shot entirely in South Africa.

Plot
Two teenagers, Rand and Val, rescue a young lioness that has been tamed by hunters. Now, they have to teach the lioness how to survive in the wild.

Cast
 Jonathan Brandis as Randolph 'Rand' Thompson
 Ariana Richards as Valerie 'Val' Porter
 Chris Noth as Dr. David Thompson
 Lea Moreno as Gina Thompson
 Linda Purl as Eleanor Porter
 John Matshikiza as George Luello
 Pamela Nomvete as Ondine Luello
 Siyabonga Twala as Jomo
 Florence Masebe as Frances
 Wandile Molebatsi as Nik Nik
 Vicky Kente as Selena Wilkinson

Connections
In 1960, Joy Adamson published a book called Born Free, based on her (and her husband, George Adamson) experience raising the lioness Elsa. The book was followed by two others, Living Free (1961) and Forever Free (1963).

Reception
Carole Horst from Variety magazine wrote: "Brandis and Richards (“Jurassic Park”) make a cute couple, and Noth and Purl do their best with the thin characters given them. Director Tommy Lee Wallace does keep things going, and cinematographer Johann Scheepers’ lensing is pretty. But the South African locations could have been used more effectively, and some scenes look like they were shot on a soundstage. Footage of animals roaming around the savanna is clumsily intercut with reaction shots of the actors, creating a jarring effect." Tom Gliatto from People magazine gave the film a C− and said: "The word “adventure” is used with impudent liberality. As with its famous 1966 movie predecessor, this two-hour production involves Elsa, a tamed lioness who needs to be reeducated to survive in the wilderness, but huge chunks of the story are devoted to Jonathan Brandis (seaQuest) in the role of a sulky American teen whose widowed father is doing viral research in Africa (where the movie was shot). But this isn’t Born Free—it’s Tiger Beat."

References

External links
 
 

1996 television films
1996 films
1996 drama films
1990s adventure drama films
1990s American films
1990s English-language films
ABC network original films
Adventure television films
American adventure drama films
American drama television films
Films about lions
Films based on non-fiction books
Films directed by Tommy Lee Wallace
Films scored by David Michael Frank
Films shot in South Africa
Television films based on books